Thao & Mirah is a collaborative studio album by Thao Nguyen & Mirah, released in 2011 on Kill Rock Stars. In support of the album Thao and Mirah toured with indie music artists such as BOBBY. It was well received by music critics; according to Pitchfork, "everything on Thao & Mirah feels of a cohesive collaborative piece, separate from either artist's solo work, a combination that synthesizes their individual strengths to outstanding effect."

Background
In early 2010, Mirah performed with Thao Nguyen at the Noise Pop Festival in San Francisco. The two later announced a 2010 North American tour, billed under the name Thao and Mirah With The Most of All. Mirah and Thao performed a collaborative set and shared vocal duties on each artist's respective songs. The two artists subsequently recorded Thao & Mirah.

Production and release
Thao & Mirah was produced by Merrill Garbus of Tune-Yards and recorded in San Francisco, California.

The two toured in support of the album while working with Air Traffic Control, an organization that provides artists a platform for social activism. To support the album, Thao and Mirah have toured with indie music artists such as BOBBY.

Critical reception

At Metacritic, which assigns a weighted average score out of 100 to reviews from mainstream critics, the album received an average score of 76% based on 11 reviews, indicating "generally favorable reviews".

According to Pitchfork, "Some songs are more clearly led by one singer or the other-- Mirah's mournful unreeling on "Spaced Out Orbit" or Thao's rusty guitar slide and junkyard drum clatter of "Squareneck"...but everything on Thao & Mirah feels of a cohesive collaborative piece, separate from either artist's solo work, a combination that synthesizes their individual strengths to outstanding effect."

Track listing

Charts

References

External links

MirahMusic.com

Mirah albums
2011 albums
Kill Rock Stars albums
Collaborative albums
Thao Nguyen albums